This is a list of songs that retell, in whole or in part, a work of literature. Albums listed here consist entirely of songs retelling a work of literature.

Albums

Songs

See also
List of songs based on a film
Wizard rock

References 

Literature
Songs
Songs